The Woman God Forgot is a 1917 American silent romance film directed by Cecil B. DeMille. A copy of the film is in the George Eastman House Motion Picture Collection.

Plot
The Exhibitors Herald, a trade magazine for independent cinemas, provides a description of the film. Moctezuma (Hatton), the Aztec king, resents the intrusion of the Spanish who have come to convert the Aztecs to Christianity. But Tecza (Farrar), daughter of the king, loves Alvarado (Reid), one of the Spanish captains, and she allows the Spanish soldiers to enter the palace. After a terrific battle, she is the only surviving Aztec and the Spanish allow her to depart in peace. Alvarado then comes wooing the last of the Aztecs and wins her.

Cast
 Wallace Reid as Alvarado
 Raymond Hatton as Moctezuma
 Hobart Bosworth as Cortez
 Theodore Kosloff as Guatemoco
 Walter Long as Taloc (High Priest)
 Julia Faye as Tecza's handmaiden
 Olga Grey as Aztec woman
 Geraldine Farrar as Tecza (daughter of Moctezuma)
 Charley Rogers as Cacamo (as Charles Rogers)
 Ramon Novarro as Aztec man (uncredited)
 Louis Weinberg a.k.a. David Marvel as Indian Prince (vaudeville dancer)

References

External links

1917 films
1910s historical romance films
American historical romance films
Films directed by Cecil B. DeMille
American silent feature films
American black-and-white films
Films set in the 16th century
Films set in Mexico
Paramount Pictures films
1910s American films
1910s English-language films
Silent historical romance films